Krasny is a rural locality (a khutor) in Mayskoye Rural Settlement of Koshekhablsky District, Adygea, Russia. The population was 221 as of 2018. There are 2 streets.

References 

Rural localities in Koshekhablsky District